Maasdijk is a village in the Dutch province of South Holland. It is a part of the municipality of Westland, and lies about 5 km northwest of Maassluis.

In 2008, the village of Maasdijk has 7000 inhabitants. The built-up area of the village is 1.5 km², and contains 4000 of the 7000 residences.
The statistical area "Maasdijk", which also can include the peripheral parts of the village, as well as the surrounding countryside, has a population of around 4060.

References

Populated places in South Holland
Westland (municipality), Netherlands